St. Augustine Girls' High School is one of five Presbyterian secondary schools in Trinidad and Tobago. It was founded in 1950 for girls between 11–19. It is a seven-year school, and caters to students writing both the Caribbean Examination Council (CXC) CSEC and CAPE exams. The school is among the top secondary schools in the country and cops several national scholarships annually.

References

Educational institutions established in 1950
Girls' schools in Trinidad and Tobago
Presbyterian schools in Trinidad and Tobago
Secondary schools in Trinidad and Tobago
1950 establishments in the British Empire